Bruce Lynch (born 1 June 1948, in New Zealand) is an electric and acoustic bassist, producer and arranger.

Music career
Arriving in the UK in the mid-1970s, Lynch became a commercially successful session musician, touring extensively with Cat Stevens, including Stevens's 1976 Earth Tour as a sideman that was recorded as the album/DVD, Majikat, released in 2004; he appeared on six of Steven's albums. His wife Suzanne Lynch sang backing vocals for much of this time.  He also recorded on two albums for Richard Thompson, and an album with Rick Wakeman as well as on Chris Rea's 1980 album Tennis and on Kate Bush's debut album. While in the UK, he was also an early member of British jazz fusion band Morrissey–Mullen, together with fellow New Zealand session musician Frank Gibson, Jr. on drums.

Returning to New Zealand in 1981, he started arranging and orchestrating for New Zealand television and jazz ensembles. He later became a record producer, producing, amongst others, Kiri te Kanawa's Maori Songs album, "(Glad I'm) Not a Kennedy" by Shona Laing, and receiving two New Zealand Music Awards: in 1981 as Producer of the Year for Dave McArtney and the Pink Flamingos, and in 1986 as Best Producer, for Peking Man.

On 18 September 2020 Yusuf/Cat Stevens released Tea for the Tillerman 2, a reimagining and re-recording of his 1970 album Tea for the Tillerman.  Lynch played bass on the new recording,and discussed the background and details of how this happened with Jesse Mulligan on RNZ.

Bruce's son, Andy Lynch, is also a well known guitarist. He has played with Sting and was formerly the lead guitarist for the band, Zed. He currently plays with the New Zealand band, Atlas. He scored several Power Rangers series after the show's production moved to Auckland and wrote the theme song for Power Rangers Mystic Force.

Discography

With Cat Stevens
(All albums with Cat Stevens were released by Island/A&M unless otherwise noted
 Buddha and the Chocolate Box (1974)
 Saturnight (Live in Tokyo) (1974) Released only in Japan)
 Numbers (1975)
 Majikat – Earth Tour (1976) Eagle
 Izitso (1977)
 Back to Earth (1978)
 Tea for the Tillerman 2 (2020)

With others
 The Kick Inside (1978) – Kate Bush, EMI 
 Rhapsodies (1979) – Rick Wakeman, A&M
 Tennis (1980) – Chris Rea, Magnet Records
 Across a Crowded Room (1985) – Richard Thompson, Polydor
 Watching the Dark – The History of Richard Thompson (1993) – Richard Thompson
 One Fine Day (2019) – Chris Rea

References

External links
 
 
 

1948 births
Living people
New Zealand musicians
New Zealand session musicians
New Zealand bass guitarists
Male bass guitarists
New Zealand record producers
New Zealand expatriates in England
Double-bassists
Male double-bassists
21st-century double-bassists
21st-century male musicians
Morrissey–Mullen members
New Zealand male guitarists
New Zealand guitarists